Khamkeut is a district (muang) of Bolikhamsai province in central Laos.

Khamkeut district was extensively bombed during the Vietnam War in the 1960s and 1970s. As of 2018, Khamkeut District continued to experience deaths from previously unexploded ordnance.

Settlements
Laotian settlements prefixed by the word Ban are usually small villages. Their names may appear with or without the prefix.

References

Districts of Bolikhamsai province